Yolande of Dreux (20 March 1263 – 2 August 1330) was a sovereign Countess of Montfort from 1311 until 1322. Through her first marriage to Alexander III of Scotland, Yolande became the Queen consort of the Kingdom of Scotland. Through her second marriage to Arthur II, Duke of Brittany, she became Duchess Consort of Brittany.

Life

Early life
She was the daughter of Robert IV, Count of Dreux, and Beatrice, Countess of Montfort. Her father was a patrilineal descendant of King Louis VI of France, making her a member of a cadet branch of the Capetian dynasty with powerful connections.

Queen of Scotland
In 1281, King Alexander III of Scotland lost his son David and two other children in the two following years, leaving his granddaughter, Margaret, Maid of Norway, as his heir presumptive. He needed to remarry to have a new heir to the throne. Yolande was daughter of the stepdaughter of Jean de Brienne, the second spouse of king Alexander's mother, queen dowager Marie de Coucy, and considered a suitable match. Yolande was related to her husband, Alexander III, through shared ancestry in the French noble houses of Coucy and Dreux. In addition to providing an heir for the Kingdom of Scotland, Alexander's marriage to Yolande represented a move to distance Alexander from his neighbour Edward I of England and to emphasize Scottish independence from England.

An embassy was sent from Scotland in February 1285 and returned with Yolande in the company of her brother Jean. The marriage was celebrated on 15 October 1285 at Jedburgh Abbey, attended by a great many nobles of France and Scotland.

Alexander died on either 18 March or 19 March 1286, after falling from his horse, while riding from his court at Edinburgh to join Yolande at Kinghorn. Following his death, queen dowager Yolande moved to Stirling Castle and declared that she was pregnant. 
The Guardians of Scotland were elected by a parliament held at Scone, Perth and Kinross on 2 April or 28 April 1286 and swore to govern the kingdom until Alexander's declared heir Margaret of Norway arrived to take the throne or Yolande gave birth to a child who would be preferred over Margaret.

It is unclear what happened to her pregnancy; either she had a miscarriage, or the baby was stillborn or died shortly after birth. However, by one account the Guardians gathered at Clackmannan on Saint Catherine's Day – 25 November 1286 – to witness the birth, but the child was stillborn. Tradition says the baby was buried at Cambuskenneth. 
After the queen dowager's pregnancy did not result in a living child, the council began preparations for Margaret of Norway to be taken to Scotland as their new sovereign.

Queen dowager Yolande remained in Scotland for a couple of years supported by her dower provisions and living possibly at Stirling Castle: it is known that she was still in Scotland at least as late as in 1288. At some point, she returned to France.

Duchess of Brittany and Countess of Montfort
In May 1294, she married Arthur II, Duke of Brittany. Together they had at least six children. Arthur died in 1312, being succeeded by his son John III, Duke of Brittany.

Yolande succeeded her mother as suo jure Countess of Montfort in 1311. She continued to manage her Scottish affairs: as late as shortly before her death, she is noted to have sent a knight to Scotland to see to her dower lands.

Yolande died on 2 August 1330 in the convent of Port-Royal des Champs outside of Paris. Her county of Montfort passed to her son John, who would later fight for his claim to his father's duchy in the Breton War of Succession.

Issue 
Yolande and Arthur had at least six children:
 John, born c. 1294, later Count of Montfort – known as Jean de Montfort 
 Beatrice, born c. 1295, married Guy X of Laval
 Joan, born c. 1296–1364, married Robert, son of Robert III of Flanders
 Alice, born c. 1297–1377, married Bouchard VI of Vendôme
 Blanche, born c. 1300, died young
 Marie, born c. 1302, entered a convent

Note

References

Sources
 Duncan, A.A.M., The Kingship of the Scots 842–1292: Succession and Independence. Edinburgh University Press, Edinburgh, 2002. 
 Macdougall, Norman, "L'Écosse à la fin du XIIIe sieclè: un royaume menacé" in James Laidlaw (ed.) The Auld Alliance: France and Scotland over 700 Years. Edinburgh University, Edinburgh, 1999. 
 Marshall, Rosalind, Scottish Queens, 1034-1714
 Richard Oram: The Kings and Queens of Scotland  
 Timothy Venning: The Kings and Queens of Scotland 
 Mike Ashley: British Kings and Queens 
 Elizabeth Ewan, Sue Innes and Sian Reynolds: The Biographical Dictionary of Scottish Women 
 Mike Ashley, The Chronicle of Lanercost 1272-1346
Necrologe de l'abbaie de Port-Royal-des-Champs

|-

|-

1263 births
1330 deaths
House of Dreux
House of Dunkeld
Scottish royal consorts
Duchesses of Brittany
Montfort, Countess of, Yolande de Dreux
14th-century women rulers
13th-century Scottish people
14th-century Scottish people
13th-century Scottish women
14th-century Scottish women
13th-century Breton people
13th-century French women
14th-century Breton people
Remarried royal consorts